Miguel Angel Domínguez Barreto (born 30 September 1979 in Ciudad del Este) is a former Paraguayan football player.

Club career
Domínguez began his professional career with Cerro Porteño in the Primera División de Paraguay. He played on loan for Barcelona in Serie A de Ecuador during 2000.
Domínguez a chance to experience Liga Indonesia to play for PSIS Semarang in the 2006. At that time he contributed to bringing PSIS Semarang became Runner Up Indonesia Premier Division.

Domínguez had an unsuccessful trial with CS Sedan in September 2001.

International career
Domínguez played for Paraguay at the 1997 and 1999 FIFA World Youth Championships.

References

1979 births
Living people
Paraguayan footballers
Paraguay under-20 international footballers
Paraguayan expatriate footballers
Paraguayan Primera División players
Cerro Porteño players
Barcelona S.C. footballers
Expatriate footballers in Ecuador
Sportspeople from Ciudad del Este
Association football midfielders